Magnolia amoena (common name Tianmu magnolia, so called from Tianmu Mountain where it grows) is a species of plant in the family Magnoliaceae. It is endemic to China.  It is threatened by habitat loss.

Gallery

References

External links
Magnolia amoena images at the Arnold Arboretum of Harvard University Plant Image Database

Flora of China
amoena
Vulnerable plants
Taxonomy articles created by Polbot